David Benjamin Rees (born Llanddewi Brefi, Wales, 1937) is a Welsh and English-language publisher, author, lecturer and minister in the Presbyterian Church of Wales since 1962.  He is a leader of the Welsh community in Liverpool, and heads one of the city's five remaining Welsh chapels. His small publishing house, Modern Welsh Publications Ltd, was established in 1963 and from 1963 to 1968 it operated from Abercynon in the Cynon Valley of South Wales. Since 1968 it has operated from Allerton, Liverpool and is the only Welsh language publishing house still operating in the city of Liverpool.

Early Life 
Born on 1 August 1937, in Abercarfan farm by the river Teify, on the outskirts of Tregaron. His parents, Ann and John Rees, were Welsh speaking Presbyterians. His father served in the two world wars. The farm was in the ownership of his grandfather David Benjamin, and after his death in 1944, he and his parents moved to Llanddewi Brefi, where he attended the local primary school.

Education 
In the local primary school in Llanddewi Brefi he passed the 11+ (an examination that gave entrance to a grammar school), granting him access to entering Tregaron grammar school. Where he excelled as a public speaker, and came to know a number of friends who have seen success in their academic and business fields. Such as, Dr John Davies (Historian), and Dr Lewis Evans of Leicester Alliance. Here, he also was highly influenced by the headmaster, D. Lloyd Jenkins, and the history mistress Eirlys Watcyn Williams, whom instilled a love of the Welsh language and culture. In his proactive approach, he became a prominent member of the debating society called "Cymdeithas Grug Y Gors" (named after the local marshland of Cors Caron). During this time, he was also heavily involved in his local village, setting up a local football club, which is still active today and is known as, "Dewi Stars". In addition, he helped setup a branch of the scouts movement in the area. His involvement in politics began during this period. He joined the Labour Party at the age of 17.
In 1955, he entered the University college of Wales Aberystwyth, where he studied 'History, Welsh and Education'. Finally graduation in Education. During his time at Aberystwyth, he was heavily involved in the Peace movement, and was one of the founding members of the local branch for the CND movement (Campaign for Nuclear Disarmament). Organiser of the local branch for the Anti-Apartheid movement. He also with help from a friend (Arfon Jones), revitalised the university Labour Party. Furthermore, he was chosen as the Welsh organiser of NALSO (National Association of Labour Students Organisation). Which meant travelling to all the colleges and universities in Wales, and to the monthly meetings in London.

In 1955, he entered the University college of Wales Aberystwyth, where he studied 'History, Welsh and Education'. Finally graduation in Education. During his time at Aberystwyth, he was heavily involved in the Peace movement, and was one of the founding members of the local branch for the CND movement (Campaign for Nuclear Disarmament). Organiser of the local branch for the Anti-Apartheid movement. He also with help from a friend (Arfon Jones), revitalised the university Labour Party. Furthermore, he was chosen as the Welsh organiser of NALSO (National Association of Labour Students Organisation). Which meant travelling to all the colleges and universities in Wales, and to the monthly meetings in London.

In 1957, he began to prepare himself for the service of the Presbyterian Church of Wales. Which entailed travelling and preaching all over Wales for Sunday services.
In 1959, he was accepted into the United Theological College Aberystwyth, to study for a BD degree. Which in those days was equivalent to a Masters degree (Higher degree). During this time, he and W. I. Cynwyl Williams were awarded the Byrsgyll y Cymro (Best debating team in universities and colleges of Wales). The following year, this was repeated with D. Ben Rees being accompanied by Emlyn Richards.

In 1959, he was accepted into the United Theological College Aberystwyth, to study for a BD degree. Which in those days was equivalent to a Masters degree (Higher degree). During this time, he and W. I. Cynwyl Williams were awarded the Byrsgyll y Cymro (Best debating team in universities and colleges of Wales). The following year, this was repeated with D. Ben Rees being accompanied by Emlyn Richards.

In 1960, he and Arfon Jones brought out a socialist student magazine in memory of Aneurin Bevan (founder of the National Health Service). Which was well received and attracted articles from well-known Labour politicians. Such as his widow, Jenny Lee, and the Transport and General Workers Union organiser, Huw T. Edwards. The magazine came to its termination when the editors left their colleges.

Service in the Presbyterian Church of Wales 

Ordained in October 1962. His first ministry was in the mining towns of Abercynon and Penrhiwceibr. During this time, he married Meinwen Llewellyn, daughtor of a local minister and a school teacher. He became active with a league of young people within Welsh Presbyterianism. In this he was involved in establishing a youth centre at Tresaith on the Cardiganshire coast. And in 1965 he took charge of another chapel in the Aberfan area. When the disaster of 21 October 1966, where 116 children and 28 adults died under the coal slurry, he became highly involved in comforting the families and organising the local Aberfan committee, along with other ministers.

In 1968 he moved with his wife, mother-in-law and son Dafydd, to Heathfield road, Bethel, Presbyterian Church of Wales. An impressive building, with a large congregation catering for the Welsh and overlooking Penny Lane in Liverpool. In addition to the Mansc (house for the minister), was the birth of his second son, Hefin Ednyfed Rees.

In 1972 he and his wife were introduced to Queen Elizabeth at the opening of the Wallasey Tunnel in Liverpool. For in that year he had been inducted as the president for the Merseyside Free church council. This council invited him to be a chaplain at the Royal Liverpool hospital, where he served for 18 years. The local and the welsh media invited him often to numerous programs, such as Songs of Praise (a television program), and Radio Merseyside: From the valleys I came (Radio interviews). His role involved a great deal of travel within the city, and also arranging pilgrimages to Israel a total of 22 times, 5 times to the USA, as well as to China, Russia, Malaysia and various European countries. He kept alive the traditions of the Emigrẻ (Exiled Welsh), and established societies that would be assistance. Such as the Merseyside Chair Eisteddfod, the council of Welsh chapels on Merseyside, a charity with his son Hefin Rees (Generating Hope in Action), the University of Wales Guild of Graduates (Liverpool branch), and the local community newspaper (The Angor [Anchor in English]), which he has edited since 1979.

In 2008 he officially retired. But due to the scarcity of ministers in his denomination, he remained part-time minister for the next 13 years. Until he handed over the responsibilities to his successor, Reverend Robert Parry in 2021. The following year he was congratulated at Wrexham in the North Wales Presbyterian Association, for completing 60 years as a preacher and historian of the missionary work of the denomination.

Educator 
In the bustling city of Liverpool and its surrounding towns, Dr D. Ben Rees has been an inspiring lecturer for the University of Liverpool Extra Mural Department, for the Open University for the WEA (Workers Education Association) and the local historical societies. He was involved as a tutor, examiner, and a Board Member for the Greenwich School of Theology College, as well as at the North Western University of South Africa, where he was made a professor.

Rotarian 
Dr Rees has been a Rotarian member in the Toxteth and Liverpool Rotarian clubs. As well as the present City of Liverpool Rotary club, where he was made an honorary member in 2021. He was editor of the Rotary magazine for district 1180, North Wales and Merseyside, for 21 years. He was awarded the highest accolade of the movement the Paul Harris Fellowship in 2003.

Honours 
In 2018 he was made Citizen of Honour for the City of Liverpool with a ceremony in the town hall. This was received for his contribution to the city, especially for serving the Liverpool Welsh community.

Peace 
From his college days, D Ben Rees has been involved in the Peace movement. Such as CND (Campaign for Nuclear Disarmament), and the Fellowship of Reconciliation, in both Wales and England. For 30 years, he served as the chairman of the Fellowship of Reconciliation (FOR) publications committee. Acting as editor, after Professor John Ferguson of Birmingham University. And also editing Peace links (monthly magazine of FOR). This campaigning for peace and justice brought him into friendship with Reverend Lord Donald Soper, Earl Bertramd Russel, Daniel Berrigan, Gwynfor Evans MP, and Monsignor Bruce Kent.

The biography Mahatma Gandhi: Pensaer yr India (Mahatma Gandhi: The Architect of India) was published in 1970. In a review in the monthly magazine Barn the Reverend Alwyn Roberts praised the title for bringing the contribution of Gandhi to a new generation of readers. This volume was the inspiration for a series of three books on Welsh pacifists. Each volume included a portrayal of the peace initiatives of well-known peace workers by academics and authors under the titles Herio'r Byd (1980), Dal i Herio'r Byd (1983) and Dal Ati i Herio'r Byd (1988), all edited by D. Ben Rees.

Literary work

In a sixty-year span as a writer D. Ben Rees has been prolific in both Welsh and English languages. His earliest books were themed around social questions, portraits of famous Welsh writers and current affairs. Then in 1975, he prepared his MSc thesis, gained from his study at the University College of Wales, Cardiff. This appeared under the title, "Chapels in the Valley: A Study in the Sociology of Welsh Nonconformity". This book was very well received world-wide by academics across different universities. Through this they were able to get a feel for what is commonly called the valleys of South-East Wales. In the same period as this, he prepared his MA thesis from the University of Liverpool. It was based on the Liverpool Welsh divine Dr Owen Thomas. The Welsh addition appeared in 1979, and gained him the Ellis Griffith Prize of the University of Wales, for the best academic book of that year. Ten years later, he brought out an English addition to the book. Which was published by the Edwyn Mellem Press in Queenstown, United States of America.

"This biography gives an interesting account of not only the Calvinistic Methodist minister and biographer but a detailed account of the religious life of Victorian Wales, the emphasis on preaching and the enthusiasm that surrounded the temperance, missionary, and allied movements. Dr. Rees has used the letters which Thomas' grandson Saunders Lewis had preserved to give a profound and interesting account of one of the most outstanding authorities on the history and development of Welsh preaching. This biography will introduce Dr. Owen Thomas to a wider circle of scholars who have not been able to appreciate his contribution as all his published works were in the Welsh language." (Blurp from Edwin Meelem Press on the book)

From the early 1980's, Dr Rees concentrated on the history of the Liverpool Welsh community. He wrote 29 books in both languages on the phenomenon of the Welsh community since the 18th Century. One of his books on the Liverpool Welsh was in the list of the best Welsh book of the year in 2020. In the last two decades he has brought out biographies of outstanding Welsh Labour leaders. In particular three in Welsh: Jim Griffiths, Cledwyn Hughes, and Gwilym Prys-Davies, which were highly praised. For Jim Griffiths and Cledwyn Hughes he also brought out English editions of the books.

To welcome the National Eisteddfod of Wales to his home town of Tregaron (August 2022), he brought out an impressive volume of the town and the surrounding villages. Named Hanes Tregaron.

Works

Currently D. Ben Rees has written/edited 81 books over the course of 57 years:

Sold over Amazon, Waterstones, News from nowhere (Liverpool) and various bookshops throughout Wales.
Arolwg 1965 (Editor) (1965)
Llyfr Gwasanaeth (Ieuenctid) (Editor) (1967)
Gwaith yr Eglwys (1967)
Mahatma Gandi : Pensaer yr India (1969)
Arolwg 1970 (Editor) (1970)
Arolwg (Editor) (1971)
Pymtheg o Wyr Llen yr Ugeinfed Ganrif (1972)
Dyrnaid o Awduron Cyfoes (Editor) (1974)
Enwogion Pedair Canrif (1400-1800) (1975)
Chapels in the Valley: Study in the Sociology of Welsh Nonconformity (1975)
Gweddiau'r Cristion (1976)
Cymry Adnabyddus 1951-1972 (1978)
Gweddiau'r Cristion (1978)
Pregethwr y Bobl: Bywyd a Gwaith Dr Owen Thomas (1979)
Wales and its Culture (1980)
Herio'r Byd (Editor) (1980)
 Gwilym Jones (Editor) (1981)
Preparation for Crisis (1981)
Cyfaredd Capel Bethesda, Cemaes, Mon (1878-1981) (Editor) (1981)
Haneswyr yr Hen Gorff (1981)
Dal I Herio'r Byd (Editor) (1983)
Gweddiau'r Cristion (1983)
Oriel o Heddychwyr Mawr y Byd (1983)
Pwy yw Pwy yng Nghymru - Who's Who in Wales, Volume 3 (1983)
The Liverpool Welsh and their Religion: two centuries of Welsh Calvinistic Methodism/Cymry Lerpwl a'u crefydd: dwy ganrif o Fethodistiaeth Galfinaidd Gymreig - R. Merfyn Jones and D. Ben Rees (Edited by D. Ben Rees) (1984)
Hanes Plwyf Llanddewi Brefi (1984)
Gwasanaethau'r Cristion (1987)
Deuddeg Diwygiwr Protestannaidd (Editor) (1988)
Dal Ati I Herio'r Byd (Editor) (1989)
May we wish you a goodnight in Hospital / Gordon A. Catherall and D. Ben Rees (1990)
A Liverpool Welsh Preacher: Dr. Owen Thomas (1990)
Prayers for Peace (1992)
Dathlu Grawnsypiau Canaan a detholiad (1995)
Graces for all occasions (1995)
Cymry Lerpwl a'r Cyffiniau Cyfrol 1 (1997)
The Welsh of Merseyside, Volume 1 (1997)
Local and Parliamentary Politics of Liverpool from 1800 to 1911 (1999)
The Hague Declaration on Peace and Justice in the Twenty First Century, Bilingual (Editor) (2000)
Cymry Lerpwl a'r Cyffiniau yn yr Ugeinfed Ganrif, Cyfrol 2 (2001)
The Welsh of Merseyside in the Twentieth Century, Volume 2 (2001)
Vehicles of Grace and Hope (2002)
Ffydd a Gwreiddiau John Saunders Lewis (Editor) (2002)
The Polymath: Reverend William Rees ('Gwilym Hiraethog' 1802-1883 of Liverpool) (2002)
Gweddiau am Gymru a'r Byd / Prayers for Wales and the World (2002)
Y Polymathiad o Gymro, Parchedig William Rees, Lerpwl (Gwilym Hiraethog 1802-1883) (2002)
Cwmni Deg Dawnus (2003)
The Call and Contribution of Dr Robert Arthur Hughes OBE, FRCA (1910-1996) and some of his predecessors in north East India Vol 1 (Editor) (2004)
Mr Evan Roberts Y Diwygiwr yn Sir Fon 1905 / Mr Evan Roberts, The revivalist in Anglesey (2005)
Alffa ac Omega: tystiolaeth y Presbyteriaid Cymraeg yn Laird Street, Penbedw (1906-2006), a bilingual volume (2006)
Arloeswyr Methodistiaeth Galfinaidd yn Mon (2006)
The Pioneers of Methodism in Anglesey (2006)
John Elias a'i Gyd Fethodistiaid Calfinaidd (1791-1841) (2007)
John Elias and the Calvinistic Methodists (1791-1841) (2007)
The Life and work of Henry Richard (2007)
Alun Owen: A Liverpool Welsh playwright (Editor) (2008)
Codi Stem a Hwyl yn Lerpwl (2008)
Labour of Love in Liverpool (2008)
Oes Aur Crefydd ym Mon 1841-1885 / A golden Age of Religion in Anglesey 1841-1885 (2008)
Dr John Williams, Brynsiencyn a'i Ddoniau (1853-1921) / Dr John Williams, Brynsiencyn and his Talents (1853-1921) (2009)
John Calvin a'i Ddisgyblion Calfinaidd Cymraeg / John Calvin and his Welsh Disciples (2009)
The sage of a revival: early Welsh Pentecostal Methodism (2010)
Y Gwron o Genefa (2012)
A portrait of Battling Bessie (2011)
Cysegr Sancteiddiolaf Capel Westminster Road, Ellesmere Port (1907-2007) / The Welsh missionary witness in Ellesmere Port (1907-2007) (2012)
Di-Ben-Draw: Hunangofiant (2015)
Dilyn Ffordd Tangnefedd: Canmlwyddiant Cymdeithas y Cymod 1914-2014) (Editor) (2015)
Cofiant James Griffiths: Arwr Glew y Werin (2015)
Y Cenhadwr Cyntaf o Blith Cymry Lerpwl: Josiah Hughes (1804-1840) / Josiah Hughes (1804-1840): The Reluctant Welsh Calvinistic Methodist Missionary of Malacca (2016)
The Healer of Shillong: Reverend Dr Hugh Gordon Roberts and the Welsh Mission Hospital (2016)
Cofiant Cledwyn Hughes: Un o Wyr mawr Mon a Chymru (2017)
Canmlwyddiant y Gadair Ddu, Gwyl Hedd Wyn / Black Chair Centenary (2017)
A Life Unlimited: An Autobiography (2018)
Hanes Rhyfeddol Cymry Lerpwl (2019)
Codi Angor Yn Lerpwl a Penbedw a Manceinion (Edited by D Ben Rees) (2019)
Jim, The Life and Work of James Griffiths: A Hero of the Welsh Nation and an Architect of the British Welfare State. (2020)
The Welsh in Liverpool: A Remarkable History (2021)
Jimmy Wilde ( 1892-1969): Undisputed Champion Of the World From 1916 to 1922: The Mighty Atom< The Tylorstown Terror< The Ghost with the Hammer in his hand (2022)
Cofiant Aneurin Bevan, Cawr o Gymro A Thad y Gwasanaeth Iechyd. (2022)
Hanes Tregaron a'r Cyffiniau (2022)
Meistri'r Awen (Golygydd: D. Ben Rees) (2022)
Cymro I'r Carn: Cofiant Gwylym Prys-Davies (2022)
Doniau Amrwiol Enidra Emyr Wyn Jones (2022)

Welsh culture
The author has written a number of books in English and Welsh on writers, Welsh figures, politicians and places.

1)  Wales: Culture Heritage (1982) is a popular introduction to the Welsh press and the eisteddfodic tradition, and seeks to define the contents of Welsh culture.

2)  Samuel Roberts (1987), a biography of the prolific Victorian author Samuel Roberts of Llanbrynmair. The book was published in English by the University of Wales Press as part of the Writers of Wales series, under the editorship of Dr Meic Stephens and Dr R. Brinley Jones.

3) 12 further volumes between 1975 and 2006, addressing Welsh Nonconformity, Victorian Studies and the history of the Liverpool Welsh community.
-- History of the Liverpool Welsh Community 
Rees is acknowledged as the leading authority on the Liverpool Welsh History since 1984 when he and Professor R.Merfyn Jones  co-authored The Liverpool Welsh and their Religion. His latest  book was based on  Ellesmere Port Welsh community ( 2012).

Theology 
Rees has become an acknowledged  scholar on John Calvin (1509-1564) and of Calvinism since the publication of four books,
three in the Welsh Language, on John Calvin  and his Welsh Disciples in the period  2008 and 2012. He delivered the prestigious
Davies Lecture on John Calvin and the Connexion at the General Assembly of his denomination in Lampeter in 2008. This has been subsequently published as Y Gwron o Genefa: John Calfin a'i ddylanwad.

References

1937 births
Living people
20th-century Welsh historians
Calvinist pacifists
21st-century Welsh historians